Junket may refer to:
Junket (dessert), a dessert made of flavoured, sweetened curds
Junket (company), a brand name of rennet tablets and dessert mixes
Film promotion, or press junket, meaning the interviews, advertising, and press releases created to promote a product, especially feature films
Junket, a name used in the UK for curds made with rennet